Lazaros Papadopoulos (born 16 August 1950) is a Greek former professional footballer who played as right midfielder and a manager.

Club career
Papadopoulos started his career at the club of his hometown, Veria. He was transferred to AEK Athens, in the summer of 1974. At the time, the presence of many notable footballers in the team's roster did not leave much room for his establishment in the basic squad. However, Papadopoulos manage to help the club in contributing to the club to their glorious days both domestically and internationally. On 1 October 1975 he scored his first goal in the UEFA competitions in the 3–1 home win against Vojvodina for the UEFA Cup. He was a part of the squad that reached to the semi-finals of the UEFA Cup in the 1977. In fact he scored the only goal of his team in the first leg of the semi finals against Juventus in the 4–1 defeat at Stadio Comunale on 6 April 1977. His last goal for AEK was on 21 February 1979, in the 4–0 victory over Acharnaikos for the round of 16 of the Cup. With the yellow-black jersey, he won 2 consecutive Championships, a Greek Cup including a domestic double in 1978. Papadopoulos left AEK at the age of 29, in the summer of 1979 to continue his career at Rodos where he played for a season. Afterwards, he competed in teams of smaller categories, before he retired as a footballer.

Managerial career
Papadopoulos after the end of his career as a football player, he followed a career as a coach, but without special distinctions. In 2008 he worked at the bench of Veria as a caretaker manager after the resignation of Vasilios Papachristou. In 2012, he had been the coach of the women's football second division side, Agrotikos Asteras Agia Varvara.

Honours

AEK Athens
Alpha Ethniki: 1977–78, 1978–79
Greek Cup: 1977–78

References

1950 births
Living people
Greek footballers
Super League Greece players
Veria F.C. players
AEK Athens F.C. players
Rodos F.C. players
Association football midfielders
Greek football managers
Veria F.C. managers
Footballers from Veria